Mona Chalabi is a British data journalist and writer of Iraqi descent, known for her publications with FiveThirtyEight and The Guardian.
She  was nominated for a News & Documentary Emmy Award in the category New Approaches: Arts, Lifestyle & Culture in 2017 and received the 2020 Shorty Award in the category Best Journalist in Social Media.

Early life 
Chalabi was born to Iraqi immigrants in East London and grew up in London. She studied at the University of Edinburgh and earned a master's degree in International Security from the Paris Institute of Political Studies in Paris, France.

Career 
After working for FiveThirtyEight, the Bank of England, the Economist Intelligence Unit and the International Organization for Migration,  she works for The Guardian US. She advocates the importance of data journalism in working to prevent politicians from making false claims. Her written work covers many diverse interests, from racial dating preferences to research on Wikipedia. In an article for the New York Times she has argued for a more empirical approach to economics. On 23 October 2015 she announced on her "Dear Mona" column that she was leaving FiveThirtyEight.

In 2015, Chalabi presented a television documentary on racism in the United Kingdom for the BBC. For National Public Radio she produces the Number of the Week. Chalabi has made several appearances on Neil deGrasse Tyson's StarTalk.

In 2016 Chalabi, with Mae Ryan, created the four-part documentary series Vagina Dispatches about physical, social, and political aspects around women's bodies. The video series was nominated for a 38th Annual News & Documentary Emmy Award in the category New Approaches: Arts, Lifestyle & Culture in 2017.

In 2017, she joined Richard Osman as a data presenter for Channel 4's Alternative Election Night, and was interviewed on The Weekly with Charlie Pickering. She also began hosting The Business of Life, a finance talk show on Viceland.
Chalabi presented her TED talk 3 ways to spot a bad statistic in early 2017.

In 2018, Chalabi launched the podcast series Strange Bird.
She is a former regular guest on Frankie Boyle's New World Order and has appeared as a guest panellist on BBC TV's satirical show Have I Got News For You.
In 2018, now based in New York, Chalabi joined American comedy panel show The Fix as a data expert.

In 2020, Chalabi received the Shorty Award in the category Best Journalist in Social Media.
Chalabi was also recognized among Fortune's 40 Under 40 in Media and Entertainment in 2020.

Chalabi's piece "100 New Yorkers" is displayed at the Westfield World Trade Center in October and November 2020.

References

External links
 

Living people
British women journalists
Data journalists
The Guardian journalists
British people of Iraqi descent
Shorty Award winners
Year of birth missing (living people)